Isabella of Castile most often refers to Queen Isabella I (1451–1504).

Isabella of Castile may also refer to:
 Isabel (d. bef. 1107), fourth wife of Alfonso VI of León and Castile, perhaps identical to Alfonso's mistress, Zaida of Seville
 Isabel, born Zaida of Seville, mistress of Alfonso VI of León and Castile, of Iberian Muslim origin, perhaps identical to Alfonso's Queen Isabel
 Infanta Isabella of Castile, (d. aft. 1272), ninth child of Alfonso X of Castile
 Isabella of Castile, Queen of Aragon (1283–1328), daughter of Sancho IV of Castile and wife of James II of Aragon and John III, Duke of Brittany
 Infanta Isabella Núñez de Lara (1340–1361), Lady of Lara and Vizcaya; daughter of Juan Núñez de Lara, wife of Infante Juan of Aragon (1331–1358)
 Infanta Isabella of Castile, Duchess of York (1355–1392), daughter of Peter of Castile and wife of Edmund of Langley, 1st Duke of York
 Isabella of Portugal, Queen of Castile (1428–1496), wife of John II of Castile and mother of Isabella I
 Isabella I of Castile (1451–1504), Queen Regnant of Castile, wife of Ferdinand II of Aragon 
 Isabella, Princess of Asturias (1470–1498), daughter of Isabella I of Castile and wife of Manuel I of Portugal
 Isabella of Austria, Isabella of Castile, Queen of Denmark, Norway and Sweden, daughter of Philip I of Castile and wife of Christian II of Denmark, Norway and Sweden
 Isabella II of Spain (1830–1904), queen of Spain, Castile, Leon, and Aragon

Other

 Isabella of Castille, a song from the album Starfucker (album)

See also
 Isabella of Spain (disambiguation)
 Isabella, Princess of Asturias (disambiguation)